Ultra Prime may refer to: 

 Ultra Prime Esports, Nenking's professional esports franchise based in China.
 Ultra-Prime, a Galactic Patrol fortress from the Lensman science fiction series.